The scaly-crowned babbler (Malacopteron cinereum) is a species of bird in the family Pellorneidae.
It is found in Brunei, Cambodia, Indonesia, Laos, Malaysia, Thailand, and Vietnam.
Its natural habitat is subtropical or tropical moist lowland forest.

References

Collar, N. J. & Robson, C. 2007. Family Timaliidae (Babblers)  pp. 70 – 291 in; del Hoyo, J., Elliott, A. & Christie, D.A. eds. Handbook of the Birds of the World, Vol. 12. Picathartes to Tits and Chickadees. Lynx Edicions, Barcelona.

scaly-crowned babbler
Birds of Southeast Asia
scaly-crowned babbler
scaly-crowned babbler
Taxonomy articles created by Polbot